Graham Geoffrey Williams (born 16 December 1985) is an English cricketer who played as a right-handed batsman and was a right-arm medium-pace bowler.  He was born in Bristol.

Williams played a single List-A match for the Gloucestershire Cricket Board against the Surrey Cricket Board in the 2002 Cheltenham & Gloucester Trophy. He also played second eleven cricket for Gloucestershire but did not make any first-class cricket appearances.

References

External links
Graham Williams at Cricinfo
Graham Williams at CricketArchive

1985 births
Living people
Cricketers from Bristol
English cricketers
Gloucestershire Cricket Board cricketers